The 2013–14 Moldovan Women's Cup is the 8th edition of the Moldovan annual football tournament. The competition began on 3 October 2013 with the First Preliminary Round and will end with the final held in May 2014.

Preliminary round
Matches took place on 3 October and 10 November 2013.

Narta win 5–1 on aggregate.

Semi-finals
Played on 4 and 17 May 2014.

Narta advance 2–2 on aggregate by away goals rule.

Noroc advance 3–2 on aggregate.

Final's
Played on 31 May 2014.

References

External links
Official website

Moldovan Women's Cup seasons
Moldovan Women's Cup 2013-14
Moldova